Brook Roberts (born c. 1983) is a reality-television personality and a former beauty queen who held the title of Miss Oregon 2004 and competed in the Miss America 2005 pageant. From 2006 to its closure in 2010, she was a host on Gems TV.  Brook and Tara Gray star in the reality-TV series The Good Buy Girls on TLC in 2013. It was canceled after four episodes due to low viewership and only 10 of the ordered 12 episodes have been broadcast.

On February 28, 2014, Roberts became a co-host of #SDLive, San Diego's regional weekly sports show, on Fox Sports San Diego.

Miss Oregon
Roberts was raised in Roseburg, Oregon, where she attended Sutherlin High School. She went on to  Southern Oregon University with majors in Communications and Journalism, earning a Bachelor of Arts degree for the latter. Roberts competed at Miss Oregon 2004 as Miss Douglas County. Her platform was "Providing a Voice for Abused and Neglected Children" and her talent was a Vocal Performance.

The Amazing Race
Roberts competed on The Amazing Race 17 with her co-worker Claire Champlin. This edition of CBS's The Amazing Race was filmed from May to June 2010 and premiered on September 26, 2010. The team's best placement was first place in Leg 2. They ended the race in second in becoming the fifth all-female team to do so after Dustin and Kandice (All Stars), Jaime and Cara (Season 14), Pamela and Vanessa (Asia Season 2), and Claire and Michelle (Asia Season 4).

References

External links
 
 
 

1980s births
Living people
Miss America 2005 delegates
Miss Oregon winners
The Amazing Race (American TV series) contestants